This article lists described species of the family Asilidae start with letter O.

A
B
C
D
E
F
G
H
I
J
K
L
M
N
O
P
Q
R
S
T
U
V
W
Y
Z

List of Species

Genus Obelophorus
 Obelophorus landbecki (Philippi, 1865)
 Obelophorus terebratus (Macquart, 1850)

Genus Odus
 Odus anushae (Richter, 1963)
 Odus fragilis (Lehr, 1986)

Genus Oidardis
 Oidardis aenecens (Hermann, 1912)
 Oidardis aveledoi (Kaletta, 1978)
 Oidardis curupaoensis (Kaletta, 1978)
 Oidardis gibba (Curran, 1930)
 Oidardis gibbosa (Hermann, 1912)
 Oidardis triangularis (Hermann, 1912)

Genus Oligopogon
 Oligopogon anatolicus (Geller-Grimm & Hradský, 2003)
 Oligopogon creticus (Geller-Grimm & Hradský, 2003)
 Oligopogon enigmatus (Oldroyd, 1974)
 Oligopogon graecus (Geller-Grimm & Hradský, 2003)
 Oligopogon harlequini (Oldroyd, 1970)
 Oligopogon hyalipennis (Oldroyd, 1959)
 Oligopogon hybotinus (Loew, 1847)
 Oligopogon londti (Geller-Grimm & Hradský, 2003)
 Oligopogon nigripennis (Engel & Cuthbertson, 1937)
 Oligopogon nitidus (Efflatoun, 1937)
 Oligopogon palestinensis (Theodor, 1980)
 Oligopogon pollinosus (Engel, 1932)
 Oligopogon rufus (Geller-Grimm & Hradský, 2003)
 Oligopogon superciliatus (Oldroyd, 1970)

Genus Oligoschema
 Oligoschema contorta (Walker, 1857)
 Oligoschema nuda (Becker, 1925)

Genus Ommatius
 Ommatius abana Curran, 1953
 Ommatius abdelkuriensis Scarbrough, 2002
 Ommatius achaetus Scarbrough, 1994
 Ommatius acornutus Scarbrough, Marasci & Hill, 2003
 Ommatius acutus Scarbrough, 1990
 Ommatius aegyptius Efflatoun, 1934
 Ommatius aequalis (Becker, 1925)
 Ommatius albovittatus Wiedemann, 1824
 Ommatius alexanderi Farr, 1965
 Ommatius alienus (Osten Sacken, 1882)
 Ommatius allopoecius Oldroyd, 1972
 Ommatius ampliatus Scarbrough, 2002
 Ommatius amula Curran, 1928
 Ommatius amurensis (Richter, 1960)
 Ommatius angulosus Scarbrough, 2002
 Ommatius angustatus Scarbrough, 2002
 Ommatius angustus Scarbrough, 2003
 Ommatius annulatus Bigot, 1887
 Ommatius annulitarsis Curran, 1927
 Ommatius apicalis (Bellardi, 1861)
 Ommatius argentatus Meijere, 1911
 Ommatius argyrochirus Wulp, 1872
 Ommatius aridus Scarbrough, 2002
 Ommatius aruensis Wulp, 1872
 Ommatius arunachalensis Joseph & Parui, 1983
 Ommatius ater Bromley, 1935
 Ommatius atrogaster Bigot, 1859
 Ommatius atrosus Scarbrough, 1997
 Ommatius auribarbis Wiedemann, 1828
 Ommatius ayalai Scarbrough, 2002
 Ommatius baboquivari Wilcox, 1936
 Ommatius bacchoides Walker, 1864
 Ommatius barbiellinii Curran, 1934
 Ommatius bastardoanus Scarbrough 2003
 Ommatius beameri Wilcox, 1936
 Ommatius bengalensis Joseph & Parui, 1987
 Ommatius bevisi Bromley, 1947
 Ommatius bicolor (Bigot, 1875)
 Ommatius bicolor Martin, 1964 (Homonym)
 Ommatius bifidus Martin, 1964
 Ommatius biharensis Joseph & Parui, 1987
 Ommatius bipartitus Scarbrough, 1985
 Ommatius biseriatus (Becker, 1925)
 Ommatius bromleyi Pritchard, 1935
 Ommatius bullatus Scarbrough, 2002
 Ommatius callidus Scarbrough, 2003
 Ommatius canicoxa Speiser, 1913
 Ommatius canus Walker, 1865
 Ommatius carbonarius Scarbrough, Marasci & Hill, 2003
 Ommatius carmichaeli Bromley, 1935
 Ommatius cassidea (Scarbrough & Marascia, 1999)
 Ommatius catus Scarbrough & Costantino, 2005
 Ommatius chiastoneurus Speiser, 1910
 Ommatius chrysopilus Oldroyd, 1972
 Ommatius cinnamomeus Scarbrough, 1984
 Ommatius cinthiae Vieira, Castro & Bravo, 2004
 Ommatius clava (Scarbrough & Marascia, 1999)
 Ommatius cnemideus Bigot, 1877
 Ommatius coeraebus Walker, 1849
 Ommatius compactus (Becker, 1925)
 Ommatius complanatus Scarbrough, 1994
 Ommatius concavus Martin, 1964
 Ommatius conciens Wulp, 1872
 Ommatius confusus Martin, 1964
 Ommatius conopsoides Wiedemann, 1828
 Ommatius constrictus Scarbrough, 2002
 Ommatius conus Scarbrough, 2002
 Ommatius cornutus Scarbrough, Marasci & Hill, 2003
 Ommatius costatus Rondani, 1850
 Ommatius crypticus Oldroyd, 1972
 Ommatius cubanus Scarbrough, 1985
 Ommatius curtus Scarbrough, Marasci & Hill, 2003
 Ommatius curvimargo (Bezzi, 1928)
 Ommatius curvipes Meijere, 1915
 Ommatius densus Martin, 1964
 Ommatius dentatus Scarbrough, 1994
 Ommatius depressus Scarbrough, 2002
 Ommatius despectus Wulp, 1872
 Ommatius destitutus Scarbrough, 2002
 Ommatius didymus Scarbrough, 1994
 Ommatius digitus Scarbrough, Marasci & Hill, 2003
 Ommatius dignus Scarbrough, 2000
 Ommatius dilatipennis Wulp, 1872
 Ommatius dimidiatus Macquart, 1850
 Ommatius dimidiatus Scarbrough, 1985
 Ommatius discalis Walker, 1861
 Ommatius discus Martin, 1964
 Ommatius dispar Macquart, 1848
 Ommatius disparis Scarbrough, 2007
 Ommatius distinctus Ricardo, 1918
 Ommatius docimus Oldroyd, 1972
 Ommatius dolabriformis Scarbrough, 2002
 Ommatius dolon Oldroyd, 1972
 Ommatius dravidicus Joseph & Parui, 1983
 Ommatius dubius Joseph & Parui, 1987
 Ommatius elusivus Scarbrough, 2003
 Ommatius emarginatus Scarbrough, 1985
 Ommatius epipomus Oldroyd, 1972
 Ommatius episkeris Oldroyd, 1972
 Ommatius erythropus Schiner, 1867
 Ommatius erythropygus Curran, 1927
 Ommatius euplocus Oldroyd, 1972
 Ommatius excurrens Wulp, 1872
 Ommatius exilis Curran, 1928
 Ommatius falcatus Scarbrough, 1984
 Ommatius fallax Bigot, 1859
 Ommatius fanovana Bromley, 1942
 Ommatius femoratus Bigot, 1875
 Ommatius fernandezi Scarbrough, 2002
 Ommatius fimbriatus Hardy, 1949
 Ommatius fimbrillus Scarbrough, 2000
 Ommatius flavescens Scarbrough, 2003
 Ommatius flavicaudus Malloch, 1929
 Ommatius flavipennis Scarbrough, 2003
 Ommatius flavipes Macquart, 1834
 Ommatius flavipyga (Becker, 1925)
 Ommatius flexus Scarbrough, 2002
 Ommatius floridensis Bullington & Lavigne, 1984
 Ommatius forticulus Scarbrough & Costantino, 2005
 Ommatius frauenfeldi Schiner, 1868
 Ommatius fulvimanus Wulp, 1872
 Ommatius furcinus Martin, 1964
 Ommatius fusciformis Becker, 1926
 Ommatius fuscipennis Bellardi, 1861
 Ommatius fuscus Joseph & Parui, 1985
 Ommatius fusiformis (Becker, 1926)
 Ommatius galba (Scarbrough & Marascia, 1999)
 Ommatius garambensis Oldroyd, 1970
 Ommatius geminus Martin, 1964
 Ommatius gemma Brimley, 1928
 Ommatius genitalis Joseph & Parui, 1987
 Ommatius gladiatus Scarbrough, 2002
 Ommatius gopalpurensis Joseph & Parui, 1987
 Ommatius gracilis Walker, 1857
 Ommatius griseipennis (Becker, 1925)
 Ommatius gwenae Scarbrough, 1984
 Ommatius haemorrhoidalis Lindner, 1955
 Ommatius hageni (Meijere, 1911)
 Ommatius haitiensis Scarbrough, 1984
 Ommatius hanebrinki Scarbrough & Rutkauskas, 1983
 Ommatius harlequin Oldroyd, 1974
 Ommatius hecale Walker, 1849
 Ommatius hierroi Scarbrough, 2003
 Ommatius hispaniolae Scarbrough, 1984
 Ommatius hispidus Scarbrough, 1985
 Ommatius holosericeus Schiner, 1867
 Ommatius hradskyi Joseph & Parui, 1983
 Ommatius hulli Joseph & Parui, 1983
 Ommatius humatus Scarbrough, 1994
 Ommatius hyacinthinus (Bigot, 1877)
 Ommatius hyalinipennis Wulp, 1898
 Ommatius impeditus Wulp, 1872
 Ommatius imperator Oldroyd, 1939
 Ommatius incurvatus Scarbrough, 1994
 Ommatius indicus Joseph & Parui, 1983
 Ommatius infirmus Wulp, 1872
 Ommatius inflatus Scarbrough, 2003
 Ommatius infractus Scarbrough, 1985
 Ommatius infuscatus Scarbrough, 1990
 Ommatius insectatus Scarbrough & Costantino, 2005
 Ommatius insularis Wulp, 1872
 Ommatius integerrimus Scarbrough, 1990
 Ommatius invehens Walker, 1864
 Ommatius jabalpurensis Joseph & Parui, 1983
 Ommatius jamaicensis Farr, 1965
 Ommatius jonesi Joseph & Parui, 1985
 Ommatius kambangensis Meijere, 1914
 Ommatius kempi Joseph & Parui, 1983
 Ommatius kodaikanalensis Joseph & Parui, 1995
 Ommatius lambertoni Bromley, 1942
 Ommatius laticrus Scarbrough & Perez-Gelabert, 2006
 Ommatius lema Walker, 1849
 Ommatius leucopogon Wiedemann, 1824
 Ommatius lineatus Martin, 1964
 Ommatius lineolatus Scarbrough, 1988
 Ommatius litoreus Scarbrough & Marascia, 2003
 Ommatius lividipes Bigot, 1891
 Ommatius longiforceps Bromley, 1942
 Ommatius longinquus Martin, 1964
 Ommatius longipennis Lindner, 1955
 Ommatius lucidatus Scarbrough, 1997
 Ommatius lucifer Walker, 1858
 Ommatius lunatus Scarbrough, 2002
 Ommatius lurismus Oldroyd, 1968
 Ommatius mackayi Ricardo, 1913
 Ommatius macquarti Bezzi, 1908
 Ommatius macroscelis Bezzi, 1906
 Ommatius maculatus Banks, 1911
 Ommatius maculosus Scarbrough & Perez-Gelabert, 2006
 Ommatius madagascariensis Macquart, 1838
 Ommatius major (Becker, 1925)
 Ommatius malabaricus Joseph & Parui, 1985
 Ommatius manipulus Oldroyd, 1972
 Ommatius marginellus (Fabricius, 1781)
 Ommatius marginosus Scarbrough, Marasci & Hill, 2003
 Ommatius mariae Scarbrough, 2000
 Ommatius medius (Becker, 1925)
 Ommatius megacephalus (Bellardi, 1861)
 Ommatius membranosus Scarbrough, 1985
 Ommatius minimus Doleschall, 1857
 Ommatius minor Doleschall, 1857
 Ommatius minusculus Scarbrough & Hill, 2000
 Ommatius minutus Bromley, 1936
 Ommatius mitrai Joseph & Parui, 1993
 Ommatius monensis Scarbrough, 1984
 Ommatius munroi Bromley, 1936
 Ommatius nanus Walker, 1851
 Ommatius narrius Scarbrough, 2002
 Ommatius nealus Oldroyd, 1960
 Ommatius nebulosus Scarbrough, 2008
 Ommatius neofimbriatus Martin, 1964
 Ommatius neotenellus Bromley, 1936
 Ommatius neotropicus Curran, 1928
 Ommatius nigellus Scarbrough, 1984
 Ommatius niger (Schiner, 1868)
 Ommatius nigrantis Scarbrough, 2003
 Ommatius nigrifemorata Bigot, 1876
 Ommatius nigripes Meijere, 1913
 Ommatius norma Curran, 1928
 Ommatius obscurus White, 1918
 Ommatius oklahomensis Bullington & Lavigne, 1984
 Ommatius orenoquensis Bigot, 1876
 Ommatius oreophilus Farr, 1965
 Ommatius ornatipes (Becker, 1926)
 Ommatius ornatus Scarbrough, Marasci & Hill, 2003
 Ommatius orus Oldroyd, 1968
 Ommatius otorus Oldroyd, 1960
 Ommatius ouachitensis Bullington & Lavigne, 1984
 Ommatius ovatus Scarbrough, 2002
 Ommatius pallidapex Bigot, 1891
 Ommatius pallidicoxa Curran, 1927
 Ommatius parvulus Schaeffer, 1916
 Ommatius parvus Bigot, 1875
 Ommatius pashokensis Joseph & Parui, 1983
 Ommatius pauper (Becker, 1925)
 Ommatius perangustimus Scarbrough, 1990
 Ommatius peregrinus (Wulp, 1872)
 Ommatius peristus Oldroyd, 1972
 Ommatius pernecessarius Scarbrough, 2003
 Ommatius perscientus Scarbrough, 2003
 Ommatius persuasus Oldroyd, 1960
 Ommatius pictipennis Bigot, 1875
 Ommatius piliferous Scarbrough, 1985
 Ommatius pillaii Joseph & Parui, 1986
 Ommatius pilosulus (Bigot, 1875)
 Ommatius pilosus White, 1916
 Ommatius pinguis Wulp, 1872
 Ommatius pisinnus Martin, 1964
 Ommatius planatus Scarbrough & Marascia, 2000
 Ommatius politus Scarbrough & Marascia, 2000
 Ommatius ponti Joseph & Parui, 1985
 Ommatius praelongus Scarbrough & Perez-Gelabert, 2006
 Ommatius praestigiatus Scarbrough, 1990
 Ommatius pretiosus Banks, 1911
 Ommatius prolongatus Scarbrough, 1985
 Ommatius pseudodravidicus Joseph & Parui, 1983
 Ommatius pseudojabalpurensis Joseph & Parui, 1999
 Ommatius pseudokempi Joseph & Parui, 1987
 Ommatius pulchellus Bromley, 1936
 Ommatius pulcher (Engel, 1885)
 Ommatius pulverius Scarbrough, 1997
 Ommatius pumilus Macquart, 1847
 Ommatius puniceus Martin, 1964
 Ommatius pygmaeus Wiedemann, 1824
 Ommatius quadratus Scarbrough, 2002
 Ommatius queenslandi Ricardo, 1913
 Ommatius ramakrishnai Joseph & Parui, 1999
 Ommatius recurvus Martin, 1964
 Ommatius retrahens Walker, 1858
 Ommatius riali Vieira, Castro & Bravo, 2005
 Ommatius rubicundus Wulp, 1872
 Ommatius ruficauda Curran, 1928
 Ommatius rufipes Macquart, 1838
 Ommatius rugula (Scarbrough & Marascia, 1999)
 Ommatius russelli Scarbrough, 1984
 Ommatius saccas Walker, 1849
 Ommatius satius Oldroyd, 1960
 Ommatius scarbroughi Rodriguez Velazquez & Fernandez Vazquez, 1998
 Ommatius schineri Martin, 1965
 Ommatius schlegelii Wulp, 1884
 Ommatius scopifer Schiner, 1868
 Ommatius segouensis Scarbrough & Marascia, 2003
 Ommatius senex Bromley, 1936
 Ommatius serenus Wulp, 1872
 Ommatius serrajiboiensis Vieira, Castro & Bravo, 2004
 Ommatius seticrista Martin, 1964
 Ommatius setiferous Scarbrough, 1988
 Ommatius setiger Martin, 1964
 Ommatius shishodiai Joseph & Parui, 1993
 Ommatius signinipes Rondani, 1875
 Ommatius similis (Becker, 1925)
 Ommatius simulans Scarbrough, 2002
 Ommatius singhi Joseph & Parui, 1993
 Ommatius singlensis Oldroyd, 1975
 Ommatius sinuatus Scarbrough, Marasci & Hill, 2003
 Ommatius sparsus Scarbrough & Hill, 2000
 Ommatius spathulatus (Doleschall, 1858)
 Ommatius speciosus Scarbrough & Hill, 2000
 Ommatius spinalis (Scarbrough & Marascia, 1996)
 Ommatius spinosus Scarbrough, 1994
 Ommatius stackelbergi (Richter, 1960)
 Ommatius stramineus Scarbrough, 1984
 Ommatius striatus (Efflatoun, 1934)
 Ommatius strictus Walker, 1859
 Ommatius strigatipes Meijere, 1911
 Ommatius strigicostus (Bezzi, 1928)
 Ommatius subgracilis Bromley, 1935
 Ommatius suffusus Wulp, 1872
 Ommatius suntius Oldroyd, 1972
 Ommatius taeniomerus Rondani, 1875
 Ommatius tamenensis Joseph & Parui, 1983
 Ommatius tandapiensis Scarbrough, 2002
 Ommatius tandoni Joseph & Parui, 1983
 Ommatius tarchetius Walker, 1849
 Ommatius tecturus (Scarbrough & Marascia, 1999)
 Ommatius tenellus Wulp, 1899
 Ommatius tepui Scarbrough, 2008
 Ommatius terminalis Bromley, 1936
 Ommatius texanus Bullington & Lavigne, 1984
 Ommatius tibialis Say, 1823
 Ommatius tinctipennis Curran, 1927
 Ommatius torulosus (Becker, 1925)
 Ommatius tractus Scarbrough, 2007
 Ommatius triangularis Scarbrough, 2002
 Ommatius tridens Martin, 1964
 Ommatius triniger Martin, 1964
 Ommatius tropidus Scarbrough, 2002
 Ommatius truncatus Joseph & Parui, 1984
 Ommatius tuberculatus Joseph & Parui, 1983
 Ommatius tucumanensis Scarbrough, 2002
 Ommatius tumidus Martin, 1964
 Ommatius tumulatus Oldroyd, 1960
 Ommatius ula (Scarbrough & Marascia, 1999)
 Ommatius uncatus Scarbrough, 1994
 Ommatius unguiculatus Scarbrough, 2002
 Ommatius unicolor (Becker, 1925)
 Ommatius upertelus Oldroyd, 1960
 Ommatius vankampeni Meijere, 1915
 Ommatius variabilis (Engel, 1929)
 Ommatius varipes Curran, 1927
 Ommatius varitibiatus (Ricardo, 1929)
 Ommatius venator Speiser, 1910
 Ommatius villosus Scarbrough, 1985
 Ommatius virgulatus Martin, 1964
 Ommatius vitreus Bigot, 1875
 Ommatius vittatus Curran, 1927
 Ommatius vitticrus Bigot, 1876
 Ommatius vivus Scarbrough, 1997
 Ommatius wilcoxi Bullington & Lavigne, 1984
 Ommatius willistoni Curran, 1928

Genus Omninablautus
 Omninablautus arenosus (Pritchard, 1935)
 Omninablautus nigripes (Wilcox, 1966)
 Omninablautus nigronotum (Wilcox, 1935)
 Omninablautus tolandi (Wilcox, 1966)

Genus Ontomyia
 Ontomyia ricardoi (Londt, 1985)

Genus Opeatocerus
 Opeatocerus purpurata (Westwood, 1850)

Genus Ophionomima
 Ophionomima solocifemur (Enderlein, 1914)

Genus Opocapsis
 Opocapsis declarata (Walker, 1858)

Genus Oratostylum
 Oratostylum crenum (Dikow & Londt, 2000)
 Oratostylum lepidum (Ricardo, 1925)
 Oratostylum zebra (Dikow & Londt, 2000)

Genus Orophotus
 Orophotus bokorus (Tomasovic & Smets, 2007)
 Orophotus chrysogaster (Becker, 1925)
 Orophotus depulsus (Walker, 1864)
 Orophotus fulvidus (Becker, 1925)
 Orophotus gracilis (Scarbrough & Duncan, 2004)
 Orophotus indianus (Joseph & Parui, 1997)
 Orophotus mandarinus (Bromley, 1928)
 Orophotus pilosus (Scarbrough & Duncan, 2004)
 Orophotus univittatus (Becker, 1925)

Genus Orrhodops
 Orrhodops americanus (Curran, 1930)
 Orrhodops occidentalis (Williston, 1901)

Genus Orthogonis
 Orthogonis andamanensis (Joseph & Parui, 1997)
 Orthogonis campbelli (Paramonov, 1958)
 Orthogonis clavata (White, 1914)
 Orthogonis complens (Walker, 1859)
 Orthogonis erythropa (Wulp, 1898)
 Orthogonis madagascarensis (Bromley, 1942)
 Orthogonis mauroides (Paramonov, 1958)
 Orthogonis nigrocaerulea (Wulp, 1872)
 Orthogonis nitididorsalis (Tagawa, 2006)
 Orthogonis obliquistriga (Walker, 1861)
 Orthogonis ornatipennis (Macquart, 1850)
 Orthogonis scapularis (Wiedemann, 1828)
 Orthogonis stygia (Bromley, 1931)
 Orthogonis zentae (Paramonov, 1958)

Genus Ospriocerus
 Ospriocerus aeacidinus (Williston, 1886)
 Ospriocerus alamoensis (Martin, 1968)
 Ospriocerus arizonensis (Bromley, 1937)
 Ospriocerus brevis (Martin, 1968)
 Ospriocerus diversus (Williston, 1901)
 Ospriocerus ebyi (Bromley, 1937)
 Ospriocerus evansi (Martin, 1968)
 Ospriocerus galadae (Martin, 1968)
 Ospriocerus longulus (Loew, 1866)
 Ospriocerus minos (Osten-Sacken, 1887)
 Ospriocerus painterorum (Martin, 1968)
 Ospriocerus parksi (Bromley, 1934)
 Ospriocerus sinaloensis (Martin, 1968)
 Ospriocerus tenebrosus (Coquillett, 1904)
 Ospriocerus tequilae (Martin, 1968)
 Ospriocerus tinkhami (Bromley, 1951)
 Ospriocerus vallensis (Martin, 1968)
 Ospriocerus villus (Martin, 1968)
 Ospriocerus youngi (Martin, 1968)

Genus Oxynoton
 Oxynoton arnaudi (Oldroyd, 1974)
 Oxynoton francoisi (Janssens, 1951)

References 

 
Asilidae